Earthquake is a 1974 American ensemble disaster drama film directed and produced by Mark Robson and starring Charlton Heston and Ava Gardner. The plot concerns the struggle for survival after a catastrophic earthquake destroys most of the city of Los Angeles, California.

Directed by Robson with a screenplay by George Fox and Mario Puzo, the film starred a large cast of well-known actors, including Heston, Gardner, George Kennedy, Lorne Greene, Geneviève Bujold, Richard Roundtree, Marjoe Gortner, Barry Sullivan, Lloyd Nolan, Victoria Principal, and (under an alias) Walter Matthau. It is notable for the use of an innovative sound effect called Sensurround, which created the sense of actually experiencing an earthquake in theatres.

Plot
On his way to work, former football star Stewart Graff, having just fought with his wife Remy, visits Denise Marshall, an actress who is the widow of one of his friends. He drops off an autographed football for her son Corry.

A mild earthquake jolts the Los Angeles metro area. At the California Seismological Institute (CSI), Walter Russell has calculated that Los Angeles will suffer a major earthquake within the next few days. Scientists at the CSI debate whether to go public with their prediction of a major quake. Fearful their funding will be jeopardized, they decide only to alert the National Guard and police so that they can be ready to mobilize.

When Rosa Amici realizes she does not have enough money to pay for her groceries, store manager Jody Joad says she can pay the difference next time. Joad learns that his Guard unit is being called up, so he heads home to change. His housemates harass and tease him for having posters of male bodybuilders on his wall.

The tremor cancels Denise's film shoot, so she goes to Stewart's office. The pair go back to Denise's house for sex. He promises to come back later that night. Returning to work, his boss and father-in-law, Sam Royce, offers Stewart the company presidency. Stewart calls Denise, breaks off their plans, and then goes to Sam's office to accept his offer. He is stunned to find Remy there, assumes she convinced Sam to offer the promotion to save their marriage, and he storms off. As Remy follows him out of the building, an earthquake measuring 9.9 on the Richter Scale strikes, destroying much of Los Angeles.

Sam and many others are trapped on the upper floors of their building due to the fire stairs and the lift being destroyed in the tremor. Sam rigs a fire hose to a chair and lowers his staff down one at a time. Before he can descend, Sam suffers a heart attack due to smoke inhalation and Stewart climbs up to rescue him before the hose snaps.

Corry has been caught on a bridge, entangled with high voltage electric cables from a fallen electrical pole. Denise finds him unconscious and climbs down to save him. Unable to climb back out, she hails a passing truck, driven by Miles Quade and Sal Amici. After saving Denise and her son, LAPD Sgt. Lou Slade commandeers the truck to use as an ambulance.

Rosa is arrested for looting by a National Guard unit led by Jody. He orders her to stay inside a secluded store for safety. Another group of troops arrives with Jody's housemates, who are being detained for looting. Jody murders them all by shooting for the ridicule he has endured from them.
	

Stewart escorts his co-workers to the Wilson Plaza shopping center, now a triage center. While Stewart searches for Denise and Corry, Sam is taken to Dr. Jim Vance, but he does not survive.

Stewart drives Sgt. Lou around, searching for survivors when they come across Jody and his unit. As Jody threatens to murder them, Rosa emerges from the store, screaming for help. Stewart drives away but stops out of sight. Lou sneaks back and gets the jump on Jody, shooting him in self-defense and rescuing Rosa.

They return to Wilson Plaza, which an aftershock has destroyed. When they realise that there are survivors trapped in an underground garage, Stewart and Lou crawl into a sewer and drill through to the garage using a jackhammer. Stewart is overjoyed to find Denise alive and, as he hugs her, he sees Remy standing just behind her.

The Mulholland Dam finally gives way, flooding the sewers. Lou and Denise make it up a ladder to safety, but as Remy climbs out, she is knocked off into the flooded sewer. Stewart looks up at Denise, but he cannot abandon Remy. Both of them, along with many others, are swept away by the water and possibly drown, leaving Denise in shock and grief.

Dr. Vance tells Lou that Los Angeles "used to be a hell of a town," as the remaining survivors take in the devastated cityscape.

Cast

 Charlton Heston as Stewart Graff
 Ava Gardner as Remy Royce-Graff
 George Kennedy as Lou Slade
 Lorne Greene as Sam Royce
 Geneviève Bujold as Denise Marshall
 Richard Roundtree as Miles Quade
 Marjoe Gortner as Jody Joad
 Barry Sullivan as Dr. Willis Stockle
 Lloyd Nolan as Dr. James Vance
 Victoria Principal as Rosa Amici
 Walter Matthau as Drunk
 Monica Lewis as Barbara
 Gabriel Dell as Sal Amici
 Pedro Armendáriz, Jr. as Emilio Chavez
 Lloyd Gough as Bill Cameron
 John Randolph as Mayor Lewis
 Kip Niven as Walter Russell
 Scott Hylands as Max
 Tiger Williams as Corry Marshall
 Donald Moffat as Dr. Harvey Johnson
 Jesse Vint as Buck
 Alan Vint as Ralph
 Michael Richardson as Hank
 John Elerick as Carl Leeds
 John S. Ragin as (Chief Inspector)
 George Murdock as (Colonel)
 Donald Mantooth as Sid
 Lionel Johnston as Sandy
 Alex A. Brown as Pool Player
 Bob Cunningham as Dr. Frank Adams
 John Dennis as Brawny Foreman
 Gene Dynarski as Fred
 Bob Gravage as Farmer Mr. Griggs
 Hard Boiled Haggerty as (Pool Player)
 Tim Herbert as Las Vegas Man
 Dave Morick as Technician
 Inez Pedroza as Laura
 Josh Albee as Boy with Radio (uncredited)

Crew

 Mark Robson: director and producer
 Bernard Donnenfeld: producer (uncredited)
 Jennings Lang: executive producer
 George Fox & Mario Puzo: writers
 John Williams: music score
 Philip Lathrop: director of photography
 Dorothy Spencer: editor
 Alexander Golitzen: production designer
 E. Preston Ames: art director
 Burton Miller: costume designer
 Albert Whitlock: visual effects
 Fred Tuch: Assistant Art Director

Production

Inception
In the wake of the tremendous success of the 1970 disaster-suspense film Airport, Universal Studios began working with executive producer Jennings Lang to come up with a new idea that would work within the same "disaster-suspense" genre. Inspiration came in the form of the San Fernando earthquake of February 1971. Director Mark Robson and Lang were intrigued by the idea of creating a disaster on film that would not be confined to an airliner, but rather take place over a large area. Producer Bernard Donnenfeld helped produce the film, but was uncredited.

Budgeted at US$7,000,000, Earthquake found itself in a race against the clock with the bigger-budgeted disaster film, The Towering Inferno, which was being produced by Irwin Allen and financed, for the first time, by two studios (20th Century Fox and Warner Bros.).

Development
Lang scored a coup when he was able to sign screenwriter Mario Puzo to write the first draft during the summer of 1972. Puzo, fresh from the success of his novel and film, The Godfather, delivered the draft script in August. However, Puzo's detailed and expansive script necessitated a larger production budget, as the action and multiple story arcs were spread over a vast geographical area in Los Angeles. Universal was faced with either cutting the script or increasing the projected budget. Puzo's involvement with Earthquake was short-lived, as Paramount Pictures was anxious to begin development with the followup to The Godfather, The Godfather Part II in early-1973. Because Puzo's services contractually were obligated to the sequel, he was unable to continue any further work on Earthquake.

The Earthquake script sat at Universal Studios for a short period, but was brought back to life by the huge success of the 20th Century Fox hit The Poseidon Adventure, released in December 1972. Fueled by that film's enormous box-office receipts, Universal Studios put pre-production on Earthquake back into high gear, hiring writer George Fox to continue work with Puzo's first draft. Fox was principally a magazine writer and never had written a screenplay, so director Mark Robson worked with him to narrow the scope of the script to fit into the budgetary constraints. After 11 drafts, Earthquake went before the cameras in February 1974.

Casting
While The Towering Inferno featured a larger "all star" cast, Universal was able to land Charlton Heston in the lead role.  Rounding out the top billing were Ava Gardner (who co-starred with Heston in 1963's 55 Days at Peking), George Kennedy, Lorne Greene, and Geneviève Bujold.  Richard Roundtree (riding a wave of success from the Shaft film series) was brought in after filming had already started, filling the part of an Evel Knievel-like motorcycle stuntman.  Former evangelical Marjoe Gortner was hired as the antagonist, Jody. Relative unknown Victoria Principal was hired to play the sister of Roundtree's business partner, Sal, played by veteran actor Gabriel Dell.

Walter Matthau was cast in a cameo role, for which he was credited as "Walter Matuschanskayasky".  Executive Producer Jennings Lang, who had worked with Matthau on the previous year's Charley Varrick was able to convince him to appear in the role (originally to be filled by veteran actor Harry Morgan).  The unpaid cameo - and his credited name - were part of the deal.

Set design
Production necessitated the complete re-dressing of the entire Universal Studios "New York Street" backlot in order to simulate the catastrophic earthquake of the title. Along with a clever use of miniatures of actual buildings, matte paintings, and full-scale sets (some of which were placed on rollers for a shaking effect), Earthquake used a new technique developed especially for the film: a "shaker mount" camera system that mimicked the effects of an earthquake by moving the entire camera body several inches side to side. This camera mount was used for most exterior scenes or other instances where shooting on location.

Stunts
Extensive use of highly trained stunt artists for the most dangerous scenes involving high falls, dodging falling debris, and flood sequences, set a Hollywood record for the most stunt artists involved in any film production up until that time: 141. Major stunt sequences in the film required careful choreography between the stunt artists and behind-the-scenes stunt technicians who were responsible for triggering full-scale effects, such as falling debris. Timing was critical, since some rigged effects involved dropping six ton chunks of reinforced concrete in order to flatten cars, with stunt performers only a few feet away. In other scenarios, some stunt artists were required to fall sixty feet onto large air bags from the rafters of Universal's largest stage (Stage 12) – for which they were paid the sum of $500. While every precaution was taken to prevent injuries, several did occur during filming. One stunt person suffered a concussion during the flood sequence (the accident was used in the film), and several stunt artists were injured during the elevator crash scene, since the set was designed to collapse upon them.

Sound effects
Universal Studios and Jennings Lang wanted Earthquake to be an "event film", something that would draw audiences into the theatre multiple times. After several ideas were tossed about (which included bouncing styrofoam faux "debris" over audience members' heads), Universal's sound department came up with a process called "Sensurround" – a series of large speakers  made by Cerwin-Vega powered by BGW amplifiers, that would pump in sub-audible "infra bass" sound waves at 120 decibels (equivalent to a jet airplane at takeoff), giving the viewer the sensation of an earthquake. The process was tested in several theatres around the United States prior to the film's release, yielding various results. A famous example is Grauman's Chinese Theatre in Hollywood, California, where the "Sensurround" cracked the plaster in the ceiling. The same theatre premiered Earthquake three months later – with a newly installed net over the audience to catch any falling debris – to tremendous success.

The "Sensurround" process proved to be a large audience draw, but not without generating a fair share of controversy. When the film premiered in Chicago, Illinois, the head of the building and safety department demanded the system be turned down, as he was afraid it would cause structural damage. In Billings, Montana, a knick-knack shop next door to a theatre using the system lost part of its inventory when items from several shelves were thrown to the floor when the system was cued during the quake scenes.

Sensurround was used again for the films Midway (1976), Rollercoaster (1977), and Battlestar Galactica (1979).

The 2006 Universal Studios Home Entertainment DVD release features the original "Sensurround" 3.1 audio track, duplicating the original theatrical "Sensurround" track (but oddly in mono directed to the front 3 speakers rather than the original stereo mix), but no actual 'rumble' generator was used, and only the two control tones that activated the generator can be heard. In addition, the film's original soundtrack was remixed in Surround Sound 5.1 which was simply a tag as once again only the control tones feature on the track.

Music
John Williams' music for Earthquake was the second of his trio of scores for large-scale disaster films, having previously scored The Poseidon Adventure and following with The Towering Inferno.  Williams scored both Earthquake and The Towering Inferno in the summer of 1974, both scores showing similarities to one another (notably Earthquake's theme and The Towering Inferno's love theme sharing the same eight-note melody). The music of the song "C'est si Bon" by Henri Betti is played on the guitar in the middle of the film. 

On December 10, 2019, La-La Land Records released a fully remastered and expanded version of Williams' music, as part of the Disaster Movie Soundtrack Collection, which includes the remastered expansions of Williams's music for this film, as well as The Towering Inferno and The Poseidon Adventure.

Pretests and re-edits
After an October 2, 1974 test screening in Joplin, Missouri, Universal opted to cut 30 minutes from the film, notably from the pre-quake sequences, at the cost of some of the dramatic flow. This included a narration sequence about the San Andreas fault and an impending catastrophic earthquake that would occur in either Los Angeles or San Francisco. This scene was filmed and was set to be shown before the opening title credits (although it was removed at the last minute, it was eventually included as the opening sequence of the NBC television edit for the September, 1976 broadcast premiere). Also excised were lengthy scenes of Remy (Gardner) and Stewart (Heston) arguing at the beginning of the film. After Remy's fake suicide, Dr. Vance (Lloyd Nolan) arrives at the Graff home and begins to talk with Stewart (an old friend). Dr. Vance inadvertently informs Stewart that Remy had an abortion two years prior (he was told it was a miscarriage). Remy appears, and they fight because Stewart wanted the baby and Remy did not. Stewart storms off. This explains why Stewart resents Remy so much. (In the final cut of the film, they just seem angry at one another.) There was more of Slade's leaving the police station, and footage of Rosa's leaving the market was shot as well. She was filmed waiting for a bus and being offered a lift from a man on a motorcycle (this footage eventually was used in the film's television cut). Just before the earthquake, Stewart and Remy had a final fight (in front of Stewart's car) that was deleted as well. During the earthquake, there was a scene of a nearby lumberyard's falling apart, and this was removed from the final cut.

Other scenes were shot to wrap up many characters' stories after the earthquake, but were deleted from the final print:  Walt Russell and Dr. Stockle – whose fates are undetermined after the quake in the theatrical release – were shown alive in the seismology laboratory post-quake. They were shown finding the earthquake's magnitude to be 9.9 on the Richter scale. The film's final scene originally had Denise's asking Lou Slade if Stewart had survived; upon hearing of his death, she walks over to Corry who has regained consciousness.

The elevator scene
A scene involving an elevator loaded with passengers plummeting 25 floors to the ground during the earthquake is one of the film's more notorious sequences, mainly for how its conclusion was depicted.  As originally scripted, the occupants were pressed to the ceiling of the elevator as it fell down the shaft, and then dropped to the floor when the elevator crashes to the bottom. To film this, an elevator set was built suspended several feet over the stage floor, allowing for the dropping of the set (with the stunt people inside).  The scene was filmed several times, with several stunt people involved. Copious amounts of stage blood were rigged to spray the stunt people inside the elevator set with blood when the set came crashing to the ground. After several tries over two separate filming days weeks apart (the break in filming was an attempt to perfect the mechanical effects involved), and with unsatisfactory results, the decision was made to edit the scene with an "animated blood" effect to be added in post production. The optical effect was superimposed over a still frame of part of the unusable footage, resulting in the "cartoonish" nature of the shot. The television version removed the animated blood sequence.

Reception 
Released in the United States on November 15, 1974, Earthquake ranked third among the high-grossing film of the year; The Towering Inferno was the highest.

Box office
Earthquake grossed $1,306,271 in its opening weekend from 62 theatres in 51 cities. It eventually grossed $79.7 million domestically ($439.2 million, adjusted for inflation in 2021 dollars) being one of the highest-grossing films of the time.

Critical response
At its release, critics generally acknowledged the special effects in Earthquake while discounting other aspects. Without either panning or praising the film, Nora Sayre of the New York Times wrote that it was an improvement on Airport '75 and observed, "The impulse to shout advice to the screen—get out! go away! don't enter that building—is quite powerful, so this does rank as a participatory movie." Judith Crist wrote in New York Magazine that "the nonsense is bearable for the spectacle. And ... here we have a feast of feats of destruction." Pauline Kael wrote "The picture is swill, but it isn't a cheat; it's an entertaining marathon of Grade-A destruction effects". Roger Ebert criticized the "witless Earthquake" for "regarding [the effects] with awe". Gene Siskel gave the film two-and-a-half stars out of four and wrote the special effects were "terrific" but identified a basic problem with the story: "With a Poseidon Adventure or an Airport the ending is clear — people are saved ultimately thru their own or somebody else's enterprise. But with an earthquake, the final solution is out of one's hands, anyone's hands - even Allstate's. If the tremors don't stop, then everybody'll die; if they do, then only a few people will die. End of story." Charles Champlin of the Los Angeles Times wrote that the Sensurround vibrations "succeed very nicely in making themselves felt as well as heard and they set up an anxiety which makes watching 'Earthquake' a very ambivalent experience for anyone who, so to speak, has been there before." Gary Arnold of The Washington Post wrote "Thanks to Sensurround, 'Earthquake' figures to be the gimmick hit of 1974. Without the gimmick, it would be difficult to distinguish this perfunctory, mediocre piece of storytelling from Universal's other disaster vehicle, Airport 1975."

On review aggregator Rotten Tomatoes the film holds an approval rating of 47% from 30 reviews with an average score of 4.90 out of 10. The website's critical consensus reads: "The destruction of Los Angeles is always a welcome sight, but Earthquake offers little besides big actors slumming through crumbling sets." Metacritic, who uses a weighed average, has assigned the film a score of 56/100 based on 6 critic reviews, indicating "mixed or average reviews".  Leonard Maltin gave the film a "BOMB" rating, stating "[the] title tells the story in hackneyed disaster epic ... Marjoe as a sex deviate and Gardner as Lorne Greene's daughter tie for film's top casting honors." Gardner was only 8 years younger than Lorne Greene.

Accolades
Earthquake was nominated for four Academy Awards. including Best Film Editing, Best Cinematography, Best Art Direction (Art Direction: Alexander Golitzen and E. Preston Ames; Set Decoration: Frank R. McKelvy) and Best Sound (Ronald Pierce and Melvin Metcalfe Sr.). It won for Best Sound (Ronald Pierce and Melvin Metcalfe Sr.) and a Special Achievement Academy Award for Visual Effects (Frank Brendel, Glen Robinson and Albert Whitlock).

The film was nominated for two Golden Globe Awards, including Best Motion Picture – Drama and Best Original Score (John Williams).

The film is recognized by American Film Institute in these lists:
 2001: AFI's 100 Years...100 Thrills – Nominated

Television version
For the film's television premiere on Sunday, September 26, 1976 on NBC, additional footage was added to expand the film's running time so it could be aired over two nights, as part of NBC's promotion of "The Big Event" fall premiere series (the second night aired on Sunday, October 3, 1976). This "television version" made no use of material left out of the theatrical release (save one brief scene featuring Victoria Principal and Reb Brown), but rather incorporated new footage filmed nearly two years after the original using two of the original film's stars, Marjoe Gortner and Victoria Principal, as well as Jesse Vint and Michael Richardson (reprising their film roles of Marjoe Gortner's taunting roommates), expanding on the original storyline from the theatrical film.  Editing and re-recorded dialogue helped integrate this expansion into the original film.  An entirely new storyline shot specifically for the television version was that of a young married couple (Debralee Scott and Sam Chew) flying to Los Angeles on an airplane. The husband seeks a job with the Royce Construction company of the film (in fact, hoping to work with Charlton Heston's character, Stewart Graff), while his wife has the eerily accurate ability to see the future with tarot cards.  Their airliner attempts to land at Los Angeles International Airport as the titular earthquake hits, and the airliner makes a touch-and-go landing on a runway that is breaking up, diverting to San Francisco. Throughout the remainder of the television version, the film cuts back to the couple as they discuss their future together, and the husband's wish to return to Los Angeles and help rebuild the city.

The "Sensurround" audio of the original film was simulcast in FM stereo in the Los Angeles and New York markets. This theoretically allowed the home viewer (with the properly equipped sound system) to experience a similar effect as in the theater.

Theme park attractions

Earthquake inspired the attractions Earthquake: The Big One at Universal Studios Florida and Hollywood.

The Hollywood attraction opened in March 1989 as part of the Studio Tour tram ride.  The tram enters a sound stage, the interior designed to look like a San Francisco underground BART station, whereupon a two-and-a-half-minute simulation of an 8.3 earthquake takes place, featuring a gas truck falling into the station, a runaway train and a flood.

The Florida attraction opened in June 1990. It began with an introductory film on the making of Earthquake with Charlton Heston appearing to explain the special effects, followed by a live demonstration based on the film with audience participation.  The attraction culminated in a simulated 8.3 earthquake aboard an underground train at Embarcadero Station in San Francisco. In the fall of 2002, the pre-show was changed to a more generic "magic of making movies" theme, with slight modifications which included mentioning special effects used in other films besides Earthquake. The Florida attraction officially closed on November 5, 2007, and reopened several months later as "Disaster!: A Major Motion Picture Ride...Starring You!."

Stock footage
Many scenes from the film, especially those featuring the destruction of Los Angeles, have appeared in other productions, often those of Universal Studios itself. Some examples include:

 Damnation Alley: In this 1977 film, the earth shifts from its axis after a full-scale nuclear war.  Flood scenes from the dam burst in Earthquake are used to help depict the earth returning to its correct axis.
 Quantum Leap: The episode "Disco Inferno" has Sam Beckett leaped in as a film stuntman. One of his jobs is on the set of Earthquake, where he is the character seen hanging from a piece of debris whom Sam Royce (Lorne Greene's character) attempts to save, but Beckett loses his grip and falls.
 Galactica 1980: In the episode "Galactica Discovers Earth", in a "computer simulation" of a devastating Cylon attack on Los Angeles, which was in turn shown in the Tom Petty music video for the song "You Got Lucky".
 V: The Final Battle: Footage from the sequence featuring the collapse of the Hollywood dam was reused during the destruction of the Visitors water pumping station.
 Barenaked Ladies music video for "Another Postcard": Parts of the film, namely when the big earthquake struck, were used.
 The Incredible Hulk: In the first-season episode "Earthquakes Happen", several building collapse scenes, the collapsing freeway overpass scene, the collapsing Spanish bells, the sliding and falling stilt houses, and the collapsing high tension wires and parts of the wooden foot bridge scenes were reused with slightly zoomed or slightly reoriented focus to minimize association with Earthquake.
 Scarface (1983) has a scene where Tony Montana is going to buy cocaine from some drug dealers, and the TV set in the motel room shows the scene in this film where the graduate assistant is explaining his earthquake theory to the director of the Seismology Institute.

Notes

The purported magnitude of the earthquake in the film (9.9 on the Richter Scale) would make it the largest ever recorded, eclipsing the record set by the actual Chilean Earthquake of 1960 (9.5 on the Richter Scale).  However, such huge earthquakes can only be generated by "megathrust" faults or asteroid strikes.  The numerous faults in California, particularly the San Andreas (the fault implied to have generated the titular earthquake in the film), are the "strike-slip" type, which historically have rarely produced tremors higher than 8.3 on the Richter Scale in recorded history.

See also
 List of American films of 1974

References

External links

 
 
 
 
 
 
 Disaster Films at filmsite.org
 "Introduction to Sensurround" March 2004 article in the 70mm Newsletter

1974 films
1970s disaster films
1970s thriller drama films
1970s American films
American disaster films
American survival films
American thriller drama films
Fictional portrayals of the Los Angeles Police Department
Films about earthquakes
Seismology in fiction
Films directed by Mark Robson
Films scored by John Williams
Films set in Los Angeles
Films shot in Los Angeles
Films that won the Best Sound Mixing Academy Award
Films that won the Best Visual Effects Academy Award
Films with screenplays by Mario Puzo
Universal Pictures films
1974 drama films
1970s English-language films